Laleh Khorramian (born 1974) is an Iranian-born American multidisciplinary visual artist. She works in printmaking, collage, video art and animation, and as a clothing designer. Khorramian is based in upstate New York, where she also runs her clothing company LALOON Studios.

Biography 
Laleh Khorramian was born in 1974 in Tehran, Iran. She was raised in Orlando, Florida. Khorramian studied at the Rhode Island School of Design; followed by study at the School of the Art Institute of Chicago where she earned a BFA degree in 1997. She earned her MFA degree in 2004, from Columbia University, School of Visual Arts.

Animation, digital media and found footage supplements use of traditional artistic media in her practice, like collage, mono-typing and drawing. In a vacillating process between them, Khorramian integrates fiction with spectacle and theatre constructions to explore the discarded and chance outcomes as a creative strategy.

Khorramian is a recipient of a Pollock-Krasner Foundation Grant and the Gottlieb Foundation Grant.

Filmography
 SOPHIE AND GOYA, 2004, 10:54 min, Color w/ sound 
 CHOPPERLADY, 2005, 9:35 min, Color w/ sound
 I WITHOUT END, 2008, 6:45 min, Color w/ sound
 I WITHOUT END… MEANWHILE, 2008, 4:20 min, Color w/ sound
 LIUTO GOLIS, 2010, 5:36 min, Color w/ sound
 WATER PANICS IN THE SEA, 2011, 12:45 min, Color w/ sound
 SKIN, 2011, 43:37 min, Color/silent

References

External links
 "Swirl World" - The Village Voice - Jerry Saltz
 "Worlds Within Worlds" - New York Foundation for the Arts - Fionn Meade (registration required)
 "I Without End"- ArtsAsiaPacific Magazine - Murtaza Vali

Living people
American artists
Columbia University School of the Arts alumni
Rhode Island School of Design alumni
School of the Art Institute of Chicago alumni
Iranian emigrants to the United States
Artists from New York (state)
People from Orlando, Florida
American artists of Iranian descent
1974 births